Conor Cleary (born 27 January 1994) is an Irish hurler who plays as a half-back for the Clare senior hurling team.

He has also played for NUI Galway, captaining them in the Fitzgibbon Cup in 2017.

He works as a teacher in Rice College Secondary School, New Road, Ennis, Clare.

Honours

Team
Clare
 National Hurling League (1): 2016
 All-Ireland Under-21 Hurling Championship (2): 2013 (sub), 2014 
 Munster Under-21 Hurling Championship (2): 2013 (sub), 2014

References

1994 births
Living people
Alumni of the University of Galway
Clare inter-county hurlers
Dual players
Kilmaley hurlers
University of Galway hurlers